Tomás Verón Lupi (born 3 September 2000) is an Argentine professional footballer who plays as a forward for Quilmes.

Club career
Verón Lupi is a product of Quilmes' youth system, having signed in 2014 after a stint with Escuelas Crinar. He made the move into senior football under the guidance of Marcelo Fuentes, who selected the forward off the bench in a Primera B Nacional fixture with Platense on 30 September 2018. Five more appearances arrived in the first part of 2018–19, all of which were as a substitute.

International career
Verón Lupi has received call-ups from Argentina's U19s; notably scoring in a friendly against Shandong Luneng U21s in April 2018. He was also selected to train with Sebastián Beccacece's U20s.

Career statistics
.

References

External links

2000 births
Living people
People from Quilmes
Argentine footballers
Argentina youth international footballers
Association football forwards
Primera Nacional players
Quilmes Atlético Club footballers
Sportspeople from Buenos Aires Province